The Bushcaddy L-160 is a Canadian kit aircraft that was designed by Jean Eudes Potvin and produced by Club Aeronautique Delisle Incorporated, Canadian Light Aircraft Sales and Service and most recently by Bushcaddy. The aircraft is supplied as a kit for amateur construction.

Design and development
The L-160 was developed from the Bushcaddy R-120 and intended to provide more cargo space or room for a child seat behind the pilot and passenger seats.

The L-160 features a strut-braced high-wing, a two-seats-in-side-by-side configuration enclosed cockpit, fixed tricycle landing gear or conventional landing gear and a single engine in tractor configuration. Floats and skis can also be fitted.

The aircraft fuselage is made with a frame of welded 6061-T6 aluminum square tubing, covered in 6061-T6 sheet. Its  span wing employs V-struts with jury struts. Cabin access is via two fold-up doors.

Construction time for the factory kit is estimated at 1200 hours. Twelve examples were reported completed and flying by December 2011.

Specifications (L-160)

References

External links

Official website

Homebuilt aircraft
Single-engined tractor aircraft
High-wing aircraft